Donald A. Larson (2 April 1915 or 1917 – 4 August 1944) was an American fighter pilot and World War II flying ace from Yakima, Washington. He attained to the rank of major in the United States Army Air Forces while serving with 505th Fighter Squadron, 339th Fighter Group. Larson Air Force Base in Moses Lake was named after him.

Early life
Larson and his identical twin brother Ronald were born in Yakima, Washington, on 2 April 1915. His parents were Alvin N. Larson and Anna D. Larson. He took flying lessons at McAllister Flying School at McAllister Field in Yakima in 1928.

Military career
Larson enlisted as an Air Cadet at McChord Field, Tacoma, Washington, in April or May 1941, where he received his flight training, and continued as a flight instructor. He was assigned to the 339th Bomb Group in 1943. That year, the 339th Bomb Group was moved from Hunter Army Air Field in Georgia to Walterboro Army Air Field in South Carolina, where they flew reconfigured P-39s in as fighter-bombers. Larson went with the 339th as it was moved to Fowlmere, England in April 1944, and began flying P-51s. He was later posted to the 505th Fighter Squadron as a combat pilot.

On 13 May 1944, he shot down his first enemy aircraft, and earned a promotion to major. Only 11 days later, on 24 May, he shot down an additional three aircraft. He earned the ace designation by shooting down his fifth enemy aircraft on 25 July 1944.

During his career, he flew three different aircraft in combat missions: P-51B #42-1066646, P-51D #42-106819 (which he named "Mary Queen of Scotts" after his girlfriend, Mary Scott), and a P-51D #44-13881 or #13889 (also named Mary, Queen of Scotts), which he was flying when he died.

Major Larson commanded an Eighth Air Force fighter squadron. An article dated 7 August 1944 (three days after Larson's death) said that the squadron had claimed "the destruction of 103 enemy planes in 100 missions—54 in the air and the rest aground." The Daily Record continued: "It also claims two enemy planes probably destroyed and 22 damaged."

Death and burial
On 4 August 1944, Larson was on a fighter sweep, and shot down his fifth and sixth enemy aircraft. His P-51D Mustang was also shot down and crashed near Uelzen, Germany. He had flown 57 combat missions. According to some sources, he had destroyed 12 enemy aircraft in his career. His body was initially recovered by enemy forces and buried near Uelzen. After his grave was discovered, his remains were re-interred at the Ardennes American Cemetery and Memorial at Neuville-en-Condroz, Neupré, Wallonia, Belgium, nine miles southwest of Liège. His grave is in Plot D, Row 11, Grave 9.

Aerial victory credits

SOURCES: Air Force Historical Study 85: USAF Credits for the Destruction of Enemy Aircraft, World War II

Awards and honors
According to U.S. Representative Hal Holmes of Ellensburg, Major Larson had "been awarded almost all the medals the air force gives". His awards included:
Silver Star
Distinguished Flying Cross with Oak Leaf Cluster
Air Medal with three clusters
Purple Heart
American Defense Service Medal
European-African-Middle Eastern Campaign Medal with two Bronze Stars
American Campaign Medal
World War II Victory Medal
The Air Force undertook a memorialization program to rename many bases in honor of local war heroes. Moses Lake Army Air Base, which operated from 1942 to 1945, reopened on 26 November 1948 and was renamed to Larson Air Force Base in May 1950 in his honor.

Although the Air Force base was closed down, the section of Moses Lake North that comprises the former base housing continues to be known as the Larson community.

Footnotes

References

1910s births

1944 deaths
People from Yakima, Washington
American World War II flying aces
Recipients of the Distinguished Flying Cross (United States)
Recipients of the Silver Star
Recipients of the Air Medal
United States Army Air Forces personnel killed in World War II
Aviators killed by being shot down
Aviators killed in aviation accidents or incidents in Germany
Burials at Ardennes American Cemetery and Memorial
Aviators from Washington (state)
Military personnel from Washington (state)